Panspermia is the hypothesis, first proposed in the 5th century BCE by the Greek philosopher Anaxagoras, that life exists throughout the Universe, distributed by space dust, meteoroids, asteroids, comets, and planetoids, as well as by spacecraft carrying unintended contamination by microorganisms. Panspermia is a fringe theory with little support amongst mainstream scientists. Critics argue that it does not answer the question of the origin of life but merely places it on another celestial body. It is also criticized because it cannot be tested experimentally.

Panspermia proposes (for example) that microscopic lifeforms which can survive the effects of space (such as extremophiles) can become trapped in debris ejected into space after collisions between planets and small Solar System bodies that harbor life. Panspermia studies concentrate not on how life began, but on methods that may distribute it in the Universe.

Pseudo-panspermia (sometimes called soft panspermia or molecular panspermia) is the well-attested  hypothesis that many of the pre-biotic organic building-blocks of life originated in space, became incorporated in the solar nebula from which planets condensed, and were further—and continuously—distributed to planetary surfaces where life then emerged.

History 

The first mention of panspermia was in the writings of the fifth-century BC Greek philosopher Anaxagoras. Panspermia began to assume a more scientific form through the proposals of Jöns Jacob Berzelius (1834), Hermann E. Richter (1865), Kelvin (1871), Hermann von Helmholtz (1879) and finally reaching the level of a detailed scientific hypothesis through the efforts of the Swedish chemist Svante Arrhenius (1903).

Fred Hoyle (1915–2001) and Chandra Wickramasinghe (born 1939) were influential proponents of panspermia. In 1974 they proposed the hypothesis that some dust in interstellar space was largely organic (containing carbon), which Wickramasinghe later proved to be correct. Hoyle and Wickramasinghe further contended that life forms continue to enter the Earth's atmosphere, and may be responsible for epidemic outbreaks, new diseases, and the genetic novelty necessary for macroevolution.

Overview

Core requirements 

Panspermia requires:
 that organic molecules originated in space (perhaps to be distributed to Earth)
 that life originated from these molecules, extraterrestrially
 that this extraterrestrial life was transported to Earth.

The creation and distribution of organic molecules from space is now uncontroversial; it is known as pseudo-panspermia. The existence of extraterrestrial life is unconfirmed but scientifically possible. The transport of such life to Earth is considered pseudo-science.

Interstellar or interplanetary 

Panspermia can be said to be either interstellar (between star systems) or interplanetary (between planets in the same star system). 

The major proposed mechanisms for panspermia are radiopanspermia, the propulsion of microbes through space by radiation pressure; lithopanspermia, the transfer of organisms inside rocks, shielded from the space environment; and directed panspermia, managed deliberately to seed planetary systems with life.

Space probes may be a viable transport mechanism for interplanetary cross-pollination within the Solar System. Space agencies have implemented planetary protection procedures to reduce the risk of planetary contamination, but microorganisms such as Tersicoccus phoenicis may be resistant to spacecraft assembly cleaning.

Origination and distribution of organic molecules: Pseudo-panspermia 

Pseudo-panspermia is the well-supported hypothesis that many of the small organic molecules used for life originated in space, and were distributed to planetary surfaces. Life then emerged on Earth, and perhaps on other planets, by the processes of abiogenesis. Evidence for pseudo-panspermia includes the discovery of organic compounds such as sugars, amino acids, and nucleobases in meteorites and other extraterrestrial bodies, and the formation of similar compounds in the laboratory under outer space conditions. A prebiotic polyester system has been explored as an example.

Radiopanspermia

Hypothesis 

In 1903, Svante Arrhenius proposed radiopanspermia, that microscopic forms of life can be propagated in space, driven by the radiation pressure from stars. Arrhenius argued that particles at a critical size below 1.5 μm would be propelled at high speed by radiation pressure of the Sun. However, because its effectiveness decreases with increasing size of the particle, this mechanism holds for very tiny particles only, such as single bacterial spores.

Counter-arguments

The main criticism of radiopanspermia came from Iosif Shklovsky and Carl Sagan, who pointed out the evidence for the lethal action of space radiation (UV and X-rays) in the cosmos. Regardless of the evidence, Wallis and Wickramasinghe argued in 2004 that the transport of individual bacteria or clumps of bacteria, is overwhelmingly more important than lithopanspermia in terms of numbers of microbes transferred, even accounting for the death rate of unprotected bacteria in transit.

Data gathered by the orbital experiments ERA, BIOPAN, EXOSTACK and EXPOSE showed that isolated spores, including those of B. subtilis, were rapidly killed  if exposed to the full space environment for merely a few seconds, but if shielded against solar UV, the spores were capable of surviving in space for up to six years while embedded in clay or meteorite powder (artificial meteorites).
Spores would therefore need to be heavily protected against UV radiation: exposure of unprotected DNA to solar UV and cosmic ionizing radiation would break it up into its constituent bases. Also, exposing DNA to the ultrahigh vacuum of space alone is sufficient to cause DNA damage, so the transport of unprotected DNA or RNA during interplanetary flights powered solely by light pressure is extremely unlikely.

The feasibility of other means of transport for the more massive shielded spores into the outer Solar System—for example, through gravitational capture by comets—is unknown. Rocks at least 1 meter in diameter are required to effectively shield resistant microorganisms, such as bacterial spores against galactic cosmic radiation. These results clearly negate the radiopanspermia hypothesis.

Lithopanspermia

Hypothesis 

Lithopanspermia, the transfer of organisms in rocks from one planet to another either through interplanetary or interstellar space, such as in comets or asteroids, remains speculative. 

A variant would be for organisms to travel between star systems on nomadic exoplanets or exomoons. 

The travel of rocks between stars in our galaxy is estimated to take millions of years, which is less than the billions of years that life on Earth has evolved.

Although there is no evidence that lithopanspermia has occurred in the Solar System, the various stages have become amenable to experimental testing.

 Planetary ejection – For lithopanspermia to occur, microorganisms must survive ejection from a planetary surface, which involves extreme forces of acceleration and shock with associated temperature excursions. Hypothetical values of shock pressures experienced by ejected rocks are obtained with Martian meteorites, which suggest the shock pressures of approximately 5 to 55 GPa, acceleration of 3 Mm/s2 and jerk of 6 Gm/s3 and post-shock temperature increases of about 1 K to 1000 K. Some organisms appear able to survive these conditions. 

 Survival in transit – The survival of microorganisms has been studied extensively using both simulated facilities and in low Earth orbit. A large number of microorganisms have been selected for exposure experiments, both human-borne microbes (significant for future crewed missions) and extremophiles (significant for determining the physiological requirements of survival in space).

 Atmospheric entry – to test whether microbes on or within rocks could survive hypervelocity entry through Earth's atmosphere. Tests could use sounding rockets and orbital vehicles. B. subtilis spores inoculated onto granite domes were twice subjected to hypervelocity atmospheric transit by launch to a ∼120 km altitude on an Orion two-stage rocket. The spores survived on the sides of the rock, but not on the forward-facing surface that reached 145 °C. As photosynthetic organisms must be close to the surface of a rock to obtain sufficient light energy, atmospheric transit might act as a filter against them by ablating the surface layers of the rock. Although cyanobacteria can survive the desiccating, freezing conditions of space, the STONE experiment showed that they cannot survive atmospheric entry. Small non-photosynthetic organisms deep within rocks might survive the exit and entry process, including impact survival.

Directed panspermia

Hypothesis 

Directed panspermia would be the deliberate transport of microorganisms in space, sent to Earth to start life here, or sent from Earth to seed new planetary systems with life by introduced species of microorganisms on lifeless planets.  The Nobel prize winner Francis Crick, along with Leslie Orgel proposed that life may have been purposely spread by an advanced extraterrestrial civilization, but considering an early "RNA world" Crick noted later that life may have originated on Earth. The astronomer Thomas Gold suggested in 1960 the hypothesis of "Cosmic Garbage", that life on Earth might have originated accidentally from a pile of waste products dumped on Earth long ago by extraterrestrial beings.

Counter-arguments 

Directed panspermia could, in theory, be demonstrated by finding a distinctive 'signature' message had been deliberately implanted into either the genome or the genetic code of the first microorganisms by our hypothetical progenitor, some 4 billion years ago. It has been suggested that the bacteriophage φX174 might represent such a message. However, there is no known mechanism that could prevent mutation and natural selection from removing such a message over long periods of time.

Hoaxes 

A separate fragment of the Orgueil meteorite (kept in a sealed glass jar since its discovery) was found in 1965 to have a seed capsule embedded in it, while the original glassy layer on the outside remained undisturbed. Despite great initial excitement, the seed was found to be that of a European Juncaceae or Rush plant that had been glued into the fragment and camouflaged using coal dust. The outer "fusion layer" was in fact glue. While the perpetrator of this hoax is unknown, it is thought that they sought to influence the 19th-century debate on spontaneous generation—rather than panspermia—by demonstrating the transformation of inorganic to biological matter.

See also

References

Further reading

External links 

 Cox, Brian. "Are we thinking about alien life all wrong?". BBC Ideas, video made by Pomona Pictures, 29 November 2021.
 Loeb, Abraham. "Did Life from Earth Escape the Solar System Eons Ago?". Scientific American, 4 November 2019
 Loeb, Abraham. "Noah's Spaceship" Scientific American, 29 November 2020

Panspermia 
Astrobiology
Origin of life
Biological hypotheses
Prebiotic chemistry
Fringe science